Jail Yatra is an Indian Hindi-language drama film released in 1947. It was directed by Gajanan Jagirdar.

Cast 
Raj Kapoor
Kamini Kaushal
Ramlal
Badri Prasad
Bikram Kapoor

Music
"Duniya Sari Jail Re" - Ninu Majumdar
"Piya Milne Naveli" - Raj Kapoor
"O Gori Kahan 7hali" - Meena Kapoor, Ninu Majumdar

References

External links

1947 films
1940s Hindi-language films
Indian prison films
Indian black-and-white films
Films directed by Gajanan Jagirdar
Indian drama films